Qurus is an administrative ward in the Karatu district of the Arusha Region of Tanzania. According to the 2012 census, the ward has a total population of 15,919.

The Qurus ward is composed of 4 villages namely, Gongali, Bashay, Genda and Qurus

A grassroots antipoverty program was developed in Gongali Village.

References

Karatu District
Wards of Arusha Region